Elliana Kathryn Walmsley (born June 23, 2007) is an American dancer and model. She became known for appearing in Lifetime's reality show Dance Moms.

Early life

Walmsley was born in Boulder, Colorado to Yolanda (née Parra) and Kevin Walmsley. She has two older brothers, Jakob and Luke. Walmsley began dancing when she was 18 months old and studied at The Joffrey Ballet, Master Ballet Academy in Scottsdale, Arizona, Elite Dance Academy in Broomfield, Colorado, The Dance Movement, now in Erie Colorado, Michelle Latimer Dance Academy in Greenwood Village, Colorado, and EDGE Performing Arts Center and The Millennium Dance Complex, both in Los Angeles. In 2015, Walmsley participated in the KAR Dance Competition held in Las Vegas and was crowned "Miss Petite Dance America".

Career

2016–2017: Career beginnings
In 2016, she joined the US reality TV show Dance Moms, alongside her mother, during Season 6 as part of the ALDC mini team. After the mini team disbanded, Walmsley joined the elite team and became a permanent member of the cast during Season 7 in 2017, before leaving at the end of the year. She returned for some episodes in season 8.

In 2017, she participated in a national tour with castmate Maesi Caes to teach dance masterclasses and give solo performances. At the end of 2017, Walmsley originated the lead role of Grace in the musical Dance Divas Nutcracker, based on Cheryl Burke's book series: Dance Divas. It was performed off-Broadway from December 13 to December 17 at Theatre Row, New York City, where a portion of the money made went towards the charity "Dancers with Cancer".

In July 2017, she competed at the annual national dance competition The Dance Awards, held in Orlando, Florida. She finished in the top ten in the Mini Female Best Dancer category. In July 2018, representing the Michelle Latimer Dance Academy, Walmsley won the title of Mini Female Best Dancer at The Dance Awards in Las Vegas, Nevada.  She has toured with 24/7, JUMP, and NUVO dance conventions in their 2019 season as the reigning TDA Mini Female Best Dancer winner at their Las Vegas Nationals. In June 2020, Walmsley competed at The Dance Awards again, but this time, in the Junior Category. She made it to the improv dance-off round and finished in the Top 15.

2018–present
In 2018, Walmsley participated in Dancing with the Stars: Juniors as a professional with Jason Maybaum and Emma Slater. In July 2019, she booked the starring role of Clara in the 2019/2020 Radio City Christmas Spectacular show alongside The Rockettes after pursuing the role for three years. In 2020, it was announced that Walmsley would star in season 7 of the Brat web-based series Chicken Girls.
Walmsey has been a YouTube personality since November 2020. She has made videos that include fellow YouTubers Emily Dobson, Piper Rockelle, and Jenna Davis.

Filmography

Television

Web series

Awards and nominations

See also
 List of dancers

References

External links
 

2007 births
21st-century American dancers
Female models from Colorado
American female dancers
People from Boulder, Colorado
Living people
Participants in American reality television series
21st-century American women